The 1982–83 All-Ireland Senior Club Football Championship was the 13th staging of the All-Ireland Senior Club Football Championship since its establishment by the Gaelic Athletic Association in 1970-71.

Nemo Rangers were the defending champions, however, they failed to qualify after being beaten by Duhallow in the 1982 Cork County Championship.

On 20 March 1983, Portlaoise won the championship following a 0–12 to 2–00 defeat of Clann na nGael in the All-Ireland final at MacDonagh Park. It remains their only championship title.

Results

Munster Senior Club Football Championship

First round

Semi-finals

Finals

All-Ireland Senior Club Football Championship

Quarter-final

Semi-finals

Final

Championship statistics

Miscellaneous

 Clann na nGael won the Connacht Club Championship title for the first time in their history.
 Portlaoise became the first team to win three Leinster Club Championship titles.

References

1982 in Gaelic football
1983 in Gaelic football